Ioan Reinhardt (also known as János Radnai; born 9 January 1920 – 6 June 1993*) was a Romanian footballer and manager. As a footballer, Reinhardt, who was a midfielder, played in 202 matches for AMEF Arad, Kolozsvári AC and Flamura Roșie Arad and scored 15 goals. Reinhardt won three titles and two Romanian Cups with Flamura.

Manager career
After retirement, Reinhardt was the manager of Locomotiva Arad until 1956, when he signed a contract with UTA Arad (former Flamura Roșie). Reinhardt was the manager of UTA in other two seasons, 1960–61 and 1961–62 and in all of its three spells, Nicolae Dumitrescu was his assistant coach. During 1962–63 season he was the assistant manager of famous József Pecsovszky, subsequently making team again with Nicolae Dumitrescu, this time with Dumitrescu as manager and Reinhardt as assistant coach. This period was the most successful in the history of UTA Arad, club which under the leadership of Dumitrescu–Reinhardt duo won another two titles, played a Romanian Cup final and eliminated the great team of Feyenoord during the 1970–71 European Cup season. At that time, Feyenoord were the defending champions.

Reinhardt left UTA in 1971 and moved to CSM Reșița, in the second league. In his first season, former UTA manager promoted "Milan from Banat" in the top-flight and maintained it at that level until 1977. In the autumn of 1977, Reinhardt was sacked and Cicerone Manolache was hired as the new manager. CSM relegated at the end of that season and since then, that period remained the most constant and successful period for the club, after World War II. With this results, Reinhardt entered in Reșița's hall of fame as well.

At short time after he left CSM, Reinhardt was named as the manager of FC Bihor Oradea, a first tier club at that time. At the end of the season, FC Bihor saved from relegation and Reinhardt left his mark once again, in decisive way. During this short period, former UTA's player and manager was helped by Alexandru Muta as assistant coach, while important players such as Paul Popovici, Ioan Naom or Attila Kun were part of the squad.

After this season, Reinhardt retired from the football management. He died in June 1993, exactly in the day in which UTA promoted back to Divizia A, after 11 years of absence. The date of death is unclear, but most probably 6 June 1993.

Honours

Player
UTA Arad
Divizia A: Winner (3) 1946–47, 1947–48, 1950
Cupa României: Winner (2) 1947–48, 1953 Runner-up (1) 1950

Kolozsvári AC
Magyar Kupa: Runner-up (1) 1943–44

Manager
UTA Arad
Divizia A: Winner (2) 1968–69, 1969–70
Cupa României: Runner-up (1) 1965–66

CSM Reșița
Divizia B: Winner (1) 1971–72

References

External links
 Ioan Reinhardt player at labtof.ro
 Ioan Reinhardt manager at labtof.ro
 Radnai János at magyarfutball.hu
 Ioan Reinhardt stats at romaniansoccer.ro

1920 births
1993 deaths
Sportspeople from Arad, Romania
Romanian footballers
Association football midfielders
Liga I players
Vagonul Arad players
FC UTA Arad players
Nemzeti Bajnokság I players
Romanian expatriate footballers
Romanian expatriate sportspeople in Hungary
Expatriate footballers in Hungary
Romanian football managers
FC UTA Arad managers
CSM Reșița managers
FC Bihor Oradea managers